The New Qing History is a historiographical school that gained prominence in the United States in the mid-1990s by offering a wide-ranging revision of history of the Manchu-led Qing dynasty of China. Orthodox historians tend to emphasize the power of the Han people to "sinicize" their conquerors in their thought and institutions. In the 1980s and early 1990s, American scholars began to learn Manchu and took advantage of newly opened Chinese- and Manchu-language archives. This research found that the Manchu rulers were savvy in manipulating their subjects and from the 1630s through at least the 18th century, emperors developed a sense of Manchu identity and used traditional Han Chinese culture and Confucian models to rule, while blending with models from other ethnic groups across the vast empire, including those from northern China, the Eurasian Steppe, Inner Asia, and Central Asia. According to some scholars, at the height of their power, the Qing regarded the Han Chinese as only a part, although a very important part, of a much wider empire that extended into the Inner Asian territories of Mongolia, Tibet, Manchuria and Xinjiang.

Some scholars like Ping-ti Ho have criticized the approach for exaggerating the Manchu character of the dynasty, and some in China accuse the American historians in the group of imposing American concerns with race and identity or even of imperialist misunderstanding to weaken China. Still others in China agree that this scholarship has opened new vistas for the study of Qing history.

The use of "New Qing History" as an approach is to be distinguished from the multi-volume history of the Qing dynasty that the Chinese State Council has been writing since 2003, which is also occasionally called "New Qing History" in English. In fact, this state project, a revision of the 1930s Draft History of Qing, is specifically written to refute the New Qing History.

Views
Prominent scholars who have been associated with the New Qing History, including Evelyn Rawski, Mark Elliott, Pamela Kyle Crossley, Laura Hostetler, Philippe Forêt, and others, despite differing among themselves on important points, represent an "Inner Asian" and "Eurasian" turn, which conceived the Manchu-ruled Qing as fundamentally different from most earlier Chinese dynasties but as similar to the Ottoman, Mughal, and Romanov (Russian) Empires across the Eurasian landmass. They argued that the Qing saw itself as a universal empire, a multi-national polity, which with "China" as only the most central and economically important component. They date the founding of the empire from 1636, when the dynasty was proclaimed, rather than from 1644, when the Qing took control of Beijing. The historians argued that "Manchu" identity was deliberately created only after the takeover of China and that the new racial identity was important but "fungible," easily exchanged for others. The first rulers of the dynasty played the Confucian role of Son of Heaven but at the same time, often behind the backs of their ethnic Han ministers, adopted other roles to rule other ethnic groups.

The military expansion of frontiers were sometimes expensive and drained resources from the rest of China. But they showed that the Qing Empire was not only a victim of imperialism but also practiced imperialism itself. Some of the historians followed Evelyn Rawski calling the Qing "Early Modern," rather than "late imperial," on the grounds that the Manchus created a centralized empire (with a much larger territory and population) that the Ming could not have created.

Origins

The origins of the New Qing History lie in Inner Asian Studies. A Harvard historian, Joseph Fletcher, studied the languages and culture of Central Asia. He was among those to discredit the idea that nearly all Manchu documents were translations from Chinese and that they would add little to the record. He wrote in 1981, "Qing scholars who want to do first-class work in the archives must, from now on, learn Manchu and routinely compare the Manchu and Chinese sources for their topics of research." Beatrice Bartlett, a Yale historian who had studied Manchu with Fletcher, reported in an article, 'Books of Revelations', that the archives in Taiwan and Beijing revealed many secrets, which required knowledge of Manchu.

The Grand Council of the Yongzheng emperor, for instance, operated only in Manchu until the 1730s, and many other important edicts and memorials did not have Chinese translations. Official use of Manchu, she argued, did not decline during the 19th century. She concluded that the archives of Manchu materials were more likely to be complete, as they were less likely to have been raided, weeded or lost.

The New Qing History took on distinct form in the mid-1990s. In 1993, Crossley and Rawski summarized the arguments for using Manchu-language materials, materials, which they and others had explored in the newly opened archives in Beijing and were beginning to use in their publications. Evelyn Rawski's presidential address, "Re-envisioning the Qing: The Significance of the Qing Period in Chinese History," at the annual meeting of the Association for Asian Studies in 1996, particularly criticized the question of the "sinicization" of the Qing that had been raised by Ping-ti Ho in his 1967 article "The Significance of the Ch'ing Period in Chinese History." Rawski's thought was based on a Manchu-centric concept of history and indicated that the reason the Qing rulers could successfully govern China for nearly 300 years was not the result of sinicization, adopting the characteristics of Han Chinese rule and culture, but by their focus on retaining the characteristics of Manchu culture. They used such characteristics to strengthen relations with other nationalities to build a multiracial empire that included Manchu, Han, Mongol, Tibetan, Uyghur and other nationalities. For better governing his multiethnic empire, for instance, the Kangxi emperor located his summer residence in the Chengde Mountain Resort, north of the Great Wall. That became the historical core of city of Chengde, which the Qianlong emperor enlarged considerably, including a replica of the Potala Palace in Lhasa. 

In response, Ping-ti Ho published "In Defense of Sinicization: A Rebuttal of Evelyn Rawski's 'Re-envisioning the Qing'". He argued that the pattern of Chinese history was for a conquest dynasty to adopt Chinese ways of rule and culture and attacked Rawski for Manchu-centrism.

The school that is now known as the "New Qing History" developed after the debate. In 2011, historian Huang Pei published a monograph that developed the objections stated by Ho Ping-ti.  

There are differences among the scholars in the loose group. For example, Rawski's Re-envisioning the Qing and Elliott’s The Manchu Way regard the Qing as a Manchu empire, with China being only one part. Nevertheless, Pamela Kyle Crossley sees the empire not as a Manchu empire but as a "simultaneous" system in which the rulership is not subordinate to the Chinese or any other single culture. She criticized the new "Manchu-centered" school for romanticism and a reliance upon disproved theories about "Altaic" language and history, but she seems to include herself in the Qing empire school, which she calls "Qing Studies."

In 2015, American historian Richard J. Smith reported that an interpretive "middle ground" had emerged between the views of Rawski and Crossley, on one hand, and Ho and Huang, on the other. Smith himself had come to the conclusion that "the Qing empire" and "China" were not the same thing and that the Qing had to be placed in not only a Manchu context but one that included Inner Asia in general and that saw China in a global field. The less "sinocentric" view, Smith continued, which placed less emphasis on "sinicization," had won over most Western scholars on China, in spite of debates over "matters of degree."

Responses
The arguments put forward in the New Qing History inspired debate on a number of specific points.

Dispute over term "China"
The scholar Zhao Gang responded against the revisionist historians by noting that they claimed that the Qing used only "China" (中國) to encompass only Han people (漢人) and "China proper" and pointed out that in fact that China proper and Han people were not synonymous with "China" in the Qing view according to Mark Elliott's own work. The Han dynasty used Zhongguo (中國) to refer only to Han areas, but the Qing dynasty reinvented the definition of Zhongguo (中國) to refer to non-Han areas as well. Zhao Gang cited Qing documents with Qing being used for the Manchu term Dulimbai Gurun (a direct translation of "中國", Zhongguo; "Middle Kingdom") in Manchu texts and Zhongguo in Chinese texts to refer to the entire Qing including Manchuria, Xinjiang, Mongolia, and Tibet as "China", in official documents, edicts, treaties, in texts like the Treaty of Nerchinsk, Convention of Kyakhta (1768), a 1755 pronouncement by the Qianlong Emperor, and a Manchu language memorial on the conquest of Dzungaria, and Qianlong's arguments for the annexation of Xinjiang, and in Qianlong's sinicization policies in parts of Xinjiang.

Mark Elliott wrote that it was under the Qing that "China" transformed into a definition of referring to lands where the "state claimed sovereignty," rather than only the Central Plains area and its people by the end of the 18th century.

Elena Barabantseva has also noted that the Manchu referred to all subjects of the Qing empire regardless of ethnicity as "Chinese" (中國之人), and they used the term Zhongguo (中國) as a synonym for the entire Qing empire but used "Hanren" (漢人) to refer only to the core area of the empire, with the entire empire viewed as multiethnic.

Joseph W. Esherick observes that while the Qing Emperors governed frontier non-Han areas in a different, separate system under the Lifan Yuan and kept them separate from Han areas and administration, it was the Manchu Qing Emperors who expanded the definition of Zhongguo (中國) and made it "flexible" by using that term to refer to the entire empire.

Other points
Scholars have disagreed on whether or how much the Manchu rulers used new forms of imperial ritual to display new forms of empire or continued rituals from the Ming to show that they saw themselves as heirs of a Han Chinese empire. Roger Des Forges' review of David M. Robinson's Martial Spectacles of the Ming Court criticized scholars of conquest dynasties and New Qing History and disagreed with the idea that  the "Royal hunt" was a differing factor between Han Chinese and conquest dynasties. He noted that the martial themed Ming dynasty Grand Review was copied by the Qing and disagreed with those who sought to present it as a Qing feature. He praised Robinson in differing from scholars who selected certain Ming and Qing emperors to contrast their difference and for not conflating Han with "Chinese" and not translating the term "Zhongguo".

The New Qing History, according to Tristan G. Brown, writing in 2011, did not explore the example of Islam and Muslims to test their argument that the early Qing emperors aspired to be universal monarchs. Brown finds that an inscription by the Qianlong emperor showed that he wanted to incorporate both Xinjiang and Islam into his empire and that this inscription, along with the "inventive structural duality of Chinese-Islamic architecture with Central Asian Turkish-Islamic architectural forms," makes the "most compelling case" that New Qing History is also applicable to Chinese Islam.

Opposition by Chinese scholars
In the journal Chinese Social Sciences Today, an official publication of the Chinese Academy of Social Sciences, Li Zhiting, a scholar working on the National Qing Dynasty Compilation Committee, charged that "'New Qing History' is academically absurd, and politically does damage to the unity of China...." He sought to "expose its mask of pseudo-academic scholarship, eliminating the deleterious effect it has had on scholarship in China." Li went on to charge that the "whole range of views [New Qing History scholars] express are cliches and stereotypes, little more than dusted off versions in a scholarly tone of the Western imperialism and Japanese imperialism of the 19th century". American scholars such as Evelyn Rawski, Mark Elliott, Pamela Kyle Crossley, and James Millward, Li continued, "view the history of China from an imperialist standpoint, with imperialist points of view and imperialist eyes, regarding 'traditional' China as an 'empire,' regarding the Qing dynasty as 'Qing dynasty imperialism.'"

Major works 
 Pamela K. Crossley, A Translucent Mirror: History and Identity in Qing Imperial Ideology. Berkeley: University of California Press, 1999.
 Mark C. Elliott, The Manchu Way: The Eight Banners and Ethnic Identity in Late Imperial China. Stanford: Stanford University Press, 2001.
 Laura Hostetler, Qing Colonial Enterprise: Ethnography and Cartography in Early Modern China. Chicago: University of Chicago Press, 2001.
 James A. Millward, Ruth W. Dunnell, Mark C. Elliott, and Philippe Forêt (eds.), New Qing Imperial History: The Making of Inner Asian Empire at Qing Chengde. London: Routledge, 2004.
 James A. Millward, Beyond the Pass: Economy, Ethnicity, and Empire in Qing Central Asia, 1759-1864. Stanford, CA: Stanford University Press, 1998.
 Peter C. Perdue, China Marches West: The Qing Conquest of Central Eurasia. Cambridge: Harvard University Press, 2005.
 Evelyn S. Rawski, The Last Emperors: A Social History of Qing Imperial Institutions. Berkeley: University of California Press, 1998.

See also 
Sinicization of the Manchus
Later Jin (1616–1636)
Qing dynasty
Conquest dynasty
Qing dynasty in Inner Asia
Names of the Qing dynasty
Debate on the Chineseness of Yuan and Qing dynasties

References

Further reading

 Biran, Michal (2017) "The Non-Han Dynasties," in M. Szonyi, ed. The Blackwell Companion to Chinese History (Oxford: Willey Blackwell): 129-143. Reviews the historiography of non-Han dynasties, highlighting the New Qing History.
 
 Crossley, Pamela. "Beyond the culture: my comments on New Qing history,"  Chinese Social Science Today November 24, 2014
 
 
 
 Fan, Xin. "The anger of Ping-Ti Ho: the Chinese nationalism of a double exile." Storia della storiografia 69.1 (2016): 147-160.
 
 
 
 
 
 

 Wu, Guo (2016) “New Qing History: Dispute, Dialog, and Influence”. The Chinese Historical Review. 23 (1).

External links
Welcome to Manchu Studies at Harvard - Including brief history of the field of Manchu studies in general.

Qing dynasty
Case studies
Historiography of China
Manchu studies
Schools of thought
Sinology